Spy Kids: Armageddon is an upcoming American spy comedy film written, directed, and produced by Robert Rodriguez, co-produced by Racer Rodriguez and Elizabeth Avellán, and starring Gina Rodriguez, Zachary Levi, Everly Carganilla and Connor Esterson. The film serves as a reboot to the original Spy Kids franchise and was produced by Troublemaker Studios in association with Skydance Media and Spyglass Media Group, while distributed by Netflix, making this their second Spy Kids project after the animated series Spy Kids: Mission Critical.

Premise
When the children of the world's greatest secret agents unwittingly help a powerful Game Developer unleash a computer virus that gives him control of all technology, they must become spies themselves to save their parents and the world.

Cast
 Gina Rodriguez
 Zachary Levi
 Everly Carganilla
 Connor Esterson
 Billy Magnussen
 D. J. Cotrona

Production
A reboot of the franchise was revealed to be in development in January 2021, with a film involving a plot that centers around a multicultural family. Robert Rodriguez serves as writer/director and a producer, while the project is a joint-venture production between Skydance Media and Spyglass Media Group. Netflix acquired a distribution rights the next year in March, making it the second Spy Kids project produced for the platform. 

The title Spy Kids: Armageddon was the original title for Spy Kids: All the Time in the World. The film's cast was revealed in the summer of 2022. Gina Rodriguez, Zachary Levi, Everly Carganilla, and Connor Esterson were cast to star in the film, along with Billy Magnussen and D. J. Cotrona. Production wrapped in late August.

References

External links
 

American adventure comedy films
American children's comedy films
American children's adventure films
American spy comedy films
American spy action films
English-language Netflix original films
Films about video games
Films about virtual reality
Films directed by Robert Rodriguez
Films produced by Elizabeth Avellán
Films produced by Robert Rodriguez
Films with screenplays by Robert Rodriguez
Spy Kids
Reboot films
Troublemaker Studios films
Skydance Media films
Spyglass Entertainment films
Upcoming films
Upcoming English-language films
Upcoming Netflix original films